Amol ( – ; ; also Romanized as Āmol and Amul) is a city and the administrative center of Amol County, Mazandaran Province, Iran, with a population of around 300,000 people.

Amol is located on the Haraz river bank. Amol It is one of the oldest cities in Iran, and a historic city, with its foundation dating back to the Amard. In the written history, Amol, in the Shahnameh, has been one of the important centers of events. Amol the center of industry and the pole of culture of Mazandaran, the rice capital of Iran, one of the most important cities of transportation, agriculture, tourism and industry in Iran, one of the dairy and meat products centers of Iran and is known as the History, Science and Philosophy city, City that does not die and Hezar Sangar city.

History

Pre-Islamic
Ammianus Marcellinus says the name the Amol city is derived from the people Amard.

In fact, Amol is one of the most ancient cities of Iran. A number of historians and geographers believe it was established in the 1st millennium BC. Some historians have attributed the rise of the city during Tahmuras.

Pishdadian and Amard

Some past historians have associated this ancient city with the periods of the Pishdadian dynasty and the Kayanian dynasty.
Amards were the people inhabiting the area before the arrival of Aryans, who had migrated to and settled on the Iranian Plateau from the late 2nd millennium BC to early 1st millennium BC. Many scholars believe that the city's name is rooted in the word Amard (Amui in Pahlavi).
Amol is an old city, with a history dating back to the Amards. According to historical literature, Amol was the capital of Mazandaran, at least in the period starting from Sassanid Empire to the Ilkhanate dynasty of Mongol Empire. Though they are a Median tribe, Herodotus names a tribe called Mardians as one of the ten to fifteen Persian tribes in Persis. It is now known that the only distinction between the Median Amardians and the Persian Mardians is the 'a' in the beginning of Amardians, which would mean they are two different tribes. Elsewhere he says, one of the peoples who have trusted Darius I

Igor M. Diakonoff says, Amardian lived in the coasts of the Caspian Sea, in the distance of the Alban and Otia from the north and the Hyrcanian from the east.

Strabo says about the Tapyri that they wore black robes and had long hair, and "he who is adjudged the bravest marries whomever he wishes" (Geography 11.8 = T520a). In the history of the Persian Empire, the Mard were handsome, capable and brave persons presented in the heart of the army and were responsible for defending the commander.)he Amard helped Achaemenid in several battles including the invasion of Greece, the occupation of Sardis, the attack of Medes and at the Battle of Opis.
The other theory about Amol via Ibn Isfandiyar says, at the request of wife Firoz Shah, he created a large and flourishing city named Amele.

Achaemenid Empire
People of Amol were the people of Amard they were one of the most important Achaemenid satraps who were the guardians of the Amard Sea, the current Caspian Sea.
Further evidence of the power of the Amol people is their fighting in the Battle of Thermopylae, Battle of Gaugamela and other Sardis forces in the Achaemenid Empire. Quintus Curtius Rufus said, Immortals (Achaemenid Empire) Archers they were all Amard people.

Parthian Empire
During the age of the Parthian Empire, Amol was one of the centers of Iran. It seems that Amol's reputation in the time of Alexander the Great and the Parthian period dominated the political-administrative Satrap was Hyrcanian.
During the Parthian period, Amol was also famous and prosperous, which was called Homo or Hamo. Parthian King Phraates I (171–173 AH) defeated the Mardas in the Amol region. He is said to have moved a group of people to the Parthian lands in northern Khorasan and settled in western Amu Darya, also known as Amol Zam.

Sassanian

According to historical literature, Amol was the capital of Mazandaran during the period starting from the 3rd century AD under the Sassanian Empire to the 13/14th century AD under the Ilkhanate dynasty of Mongol Empire.
Before Islam, Amol was one of the largest and most important cities in the region and was considered the center of Mazandaran. The city of Amol existed before the Sassanids and during the Alexander period. During the Sassanid period, the importance of this Amol was increased due to the escape of the followers of Mazdak to this city.
Based on pieces of evidence, including the coins found during excavations in addition to Muslim historical books, Amol was the capital of Mazandaran province during the Sassanid Era.
According to historical literature, Amol was the capital of Mazandaran during the period starting from the 3rd century under Sassanian Empire to the 13/14th century under the Ilkhanate dynasty of Mongol Empire. On Sasanian coins, coin cities where there has been abbreviated name is known, but mark m was Amol. During the Bahram V Amol were Central of Iran and at during the Khosrow II and Dabuyid dynasty capital Mazandaran.
Amu Darya Sasanian mid pers river about 2,500 km long, regarded in ancient times as the boundary between Iran and Turan, the modern name may be derived from Amol.
In city during this period has Temple, Market, fireplace there was. Ibn Rawi in his book calls Amol bigger than Isfahan and Qazvin.

In Hudud al-'Alam says about Amol, is great city with most moat and castle, the universe and origin of merchants and at city Carpet, mat, boxwood, bowl, brick and medallion is found.

Herodotus in Histories say, mentions the tribes of the Tabaristan the Mard or the Amards In the time of the king Darius the Great from influential and tribes people. During the Sassanid period, the city of Amol enjoyed development and was the center of the important province of Tabarestan. During its development, the city had infrastructures and elements such as government citadels, neighborhoods, fire temples and bazaars. During this period, Amol had a fire temple in the area, called name Avam Kuye.

Dabuyid dynasty and Bavand dynasty Iranian dynasty, were the kings of the Sassanid dynasty, they lived in Amol and it was the city capital of these dynasties.
The coins of Ispahbudhan of Tabarestan and the Arab and Sassanid periods have been minted in Amol mint and sometimes in Sari.
It can be argued that the mints of several cities in Mazandaran, especially Amol and Sari, such as the city of Gorgan, was have been engaged in minting various coins for 1,300 years.

Islam

Abbasid, Alid, Ziyarid, Marashis 
Amol, in the era of the Alid dynasties and Marashis dynasty, was the capital of Northern Iran. The inhabitants of Amol embraced Islam during the reign of Mahdi (775–785), the Abbasid Caliph. Amol was also the capital city of the Bavand dynasty and Ziyarid dynasty.
The people of Amol initially resisted the Arabs.
Today, Amol is a thriving modern metropolis. In the Abbasid Caliphate of the ninth century, Amol was one of the largest cities in Iran. Khalid ibn Barmak built a palace in the city and ruled for years. People from the Qarinvand dynasty arrived a couple of years and fought with the Abbasid Caliphate to win the kingdom.
During the Umayyad Caliphate period, during the reign of Muawiyah I, Sa'id ibn al-As undertook the conquest of Tabaristan, and with an army of 4,000 troops rushed there, and the whole war between him and Farrukhan the Great lasted for two whole years, but was postponed. The conflict lasted until Abbasid Caliphate until the attack of the Persian general Wandad Hurmuzd.

In Hudud al-'Alam, Amol is regarded as a great city with active commerce and trading ventures. However, resentment with the Tahirids rule increased due to the oppressive activities of their officials. People of the provinces pledged alliance to Hasan ibn Zayd. Zayd became the founder of the Zaydid dynasty of Tabaristan Alavids government in Tabaristan established and it's with Amol centered and 106-year domination of the Abbasids in the territory ended.
Yaqub ibn Layth the was geostrategy in Amol. Hasan al-Utrush with a trip to Amol who re-established Zaydid rule over the province Tabaristan in northern Iran in 914, after fourteen years of Samanid rule.
After the Alid dynasty, the Ziyarid dynasty ruled Iran and Tabaristan. At this time Amol was developed in such a way that geographers have written articles about the industry and its silk.
Hasan ibn Zayd, nicknamed al-Dai al-kabir, appeared in the Tabaristan region in 250 AH, and many dissatisfied people and the captives of the Caliph Tahirid strengthened him. He invited people and published the Shiite religion. After coming to power in Tabaristan, Daei Kabir moved his capital from Sari to Amol, which was Taherian's seat.
In 260 A.D., Ya'qub ibn al-Layth al-Saffar marched on Tabaristan and entered Amol after the departure of Hassan ibn Zayd, but his rule did not last long and the Alavids recaptured the city again. The Alawites ruled the city until Ziyarid and Buyid, who were the handmaidens of the Shiites. The people of Amol were very militant and stood up to the Arabs, but social injustice and class divisions led the people to convert to Islam.

Qabus was in 1012 overthrown by his own army, and was succeeded by his son Manuchihr, who quickly recognized the sovereignty of Mahmud of Ghazni, and married one of his daughters. Manuchihr died in 1031, and was succeeded by his son Anushirvan Sharaf al-Ma'ali whom Mahmud of Ghazni had chosen as the heir of the Ziyarid dynasty. From 1032 to 1040, the real power behind the throne was held by Abu Kalijar ibn Vayhan, a relative of Anushirvan Sharaf al-Ma'ali. During this period, Amol was chosen as the capital of Iran and until 1090. He also the first seminary by Hasan al-Utrush built in Amol, which was later named Imam Hassan Askari Mosque.
The subsequent Afrasiyab dynasty flourished in the late medieval, pre-Safavid period; it is also called the Kia dynasty. It was founded by Kiya Afrasiyab, who conquered the Bavand kingdom in 1349 and made himself king of the region, in Amol.
In this period Sheikh Khalifa Mazandarani of Amol, was a leader Sarbadars.
Amol during the ministry of Khajeh Nizam al-Mulk Tusi in the Seljuq dynasty, along with the big cities of that time, the Islamic world Nishapur, Balkh, Herat, Baghdad and Isfahan had a prestigious Nezamiyeh modern school.

Safavid
In time of the Safavid rulers of Mazandaran, Amol experienced a period of growth. The city was the favorite dwelling of Abbas II of Persia, who often frequented it. At the time Amol was considered "the capital of the inhabited world" and acclaimed for its grandeur. Several bridges were built in the area, across the Haraz river, at this time.
During the Safavid era, especially during the reign of Abbas the Great, Mazandaran was considered and a road from Astarabad and Sari to Amol was built.

in town was founded through trade center position and business centers already exceeded and founded artillery.
The town has spacious and well-supplied bazaars and post and telegraph offices. Excavations in Amol at Hall of Fame have uncovered glazed ceramic and glass belonging to Islamic and modern periods
But after the Mongol invasion, the region was subject to devastation and it was during this time that Sari was declared as capital. In the beginning of the 7th century, Hessamedin Ardeshir, shifted the capital from Sari to Amol and constructed his palace there.
At this time, a Palace and Ab Anbar was built by the order of Shah Abbas, and the tomb of Mir Ghavam al-Din (Mir Bozorg), which had been destroyed by Timur's agents, was magnificently rebuilt.
Amol recovered a certain measure of prosperity while ruled by the Marashiyan and the Safavids under the latter it was a center of the province of Mazandaran. Since then it has never played a leading part in Persian national affairs, being surpassed in population by Babol and by the administrative capital of the province Sari, it has also suffered at various times from earthquakes.
In continuation, Haraz River crosses the city of coal and iron mining region of Amol much iron can also have it in the past.

Afsharid
Amol in Afsharid dynasty and Zand dynasty as a city for trade and construction were instruments of war. In During the Nader Shah in town was founded Iron plant through trade center position to make cannonballs, mortars and horseshoes and business centers already exceeded and founded artillery. This was the first artillery workshop in Iran
Jonas Hanway came to Iran at this time and visited Amol and says about this city, Due to the abundance of iron ore mines, by Nader Shah order, Amol it became the most important foundry and steel plant, where cannonballs, rifles and horseshoes were produced, and Nader Shah it was even decided to build the Iranian Navy in Amol.
At first, the people and rulers of Larijan and Amol, in support of Zand dynasty, resisted Agha Mohammad Khan Qajar and defeated him.

Qajar

In the Qajar era, road and railway from Tehran to Amol, Amol was pulled from Mahmoudabad.
Ibn Hawqal says, the geographers of the 4th to 10th century describe Amol great prosperity and prosperity, in the latter respect, according to Ebn Ḥawqal, it surpassed Qazvin. Its inner city was protected by a moat, and the houses were constructed of wood and reeds rather than mud bricks on account of the heavy summer rainfall. Rice, fruits, and vegetables grew profusely, and the town was a center for the fabrication of wooden articles, textiles, and carpets, the silks being especially famous. Amol port on the Caspian was the little town of named Ahlam or Ahlom.
James George Frazer entered Iran in 1238 as a merchant and scientist and said about this city in his travelogue, the city truly great and vast. people were decent and respectable inhabitants of the city.
Several leaders of the Iranian constitutional revolutions of 1905 and 1911 hailed from Amol. Mulla Ali Kani, one Amoli people reformist who led the people, had a great role in achievement to the goals of Iran's constitutional revolution.
During this period, was built many homes in the city. Although today Amol has expanded greatly on both sides of the Haraz river, its functions are still the same as they were seventy or eighty years ago. The Amol cotton cleaning plant was built in 1906 by the Russians. Prior to that, two company Rosenblum and Osser in one of Amol borough that is, Barforoush was active.
In the 19th century, Amol iron and iron goods were traded all over Iran and as far abroad as Baghdad, Mosul and Damascus. Today, the main industries are food processing factories rice, minor woodworking shops, and a few brickworks.
Pierre Amédée Jaubert say, the Dispatch ambassador Napoleon Royal court Fath Ali Shah Qajar visited Amol and mentioned in his book about the Haraz River and the centralization of Steel workshops on its shores.
Although today Amol has expanded greatly on both sides of the Haraz river, its functions are still the same as they were seventy or eighty years ago. Besides being one of the county centers of the province of Mazandaran, it is a busy commercial center. In itinerary book says, Amol is a magnificent city with 4 gates, although there is no gate installed, namely Darvaze Tehran or Larijan, Barforosh, Taliksar and Nur.

After the fall of the Mongols, the Marashians appeared in Mazandaran. In 760 AH, Mir Ghavam al-Din Marashi established the Marashis government. The Marashis uprising began in Amol. After gaining power, the Marashians soon occupied all the lands and areas around Mazandaran and expanded their territory from Gorgan to Qazvin and Isfahan.

In interval Persian Campaign, Community Tabaristan by Amir Movayed Savadkoohi, with, the support Influential men of Amol, founded to oppose the British and the Russians. Vsevolod Starosselsky in Amol build a Headquarters for capture it other cities in Mazandaran. Mirza Kuchak Khan To deal with him, entered Amol through the port of Ahlam with Khan's Amol and left the city after a long involvement against Persian Cossack Brigade.

In this epoch, with the support of the Shah and the wealth of Amin al-Zarb, the first modern railway in the history of Iran was established in Amol. Twenty-one kilometers of railway linking Amol and the iron mines of Mahan Nour to the Caspian port of Mahmoudabad in the name of Naseriyah. In 1887, the project prompted of Amin al zarb after three visits to Europe and the contract for the construction of the railway was signed with the British company Quzi and a Belgian company. In the end of the reign of Naser al-Din Shah Qajar, railway it was completed in 1891 but never used due to the involvement of local people and Russians. About 700,000 tomans were invested for project. Following the development technocracy policies of Iran by Amin al zarab, was established the first Steel mill of Iran in Amol. In 1887, Amin al zarb obtained an exclusive permit from Nasser al-Din Shah for 30 years to establish a smelter, and bought an eight-meter furnace with a production capacity of 15 tons of iron from France on for 24-hour and settled in Amol.

20th century

Pahlavi, Islamic Republic of Iran
During the reign of Reza Shah Pahlavi, the face of the town was changed drastically. Schools and most of the streets and governmental buildings current Amol date from that era. During this period, by the order of Reza Shah, Austrian and German engineers, they built Moalagh Bridge, Municipal mansion, Municipal hotel, Chaikhori palace, Pahlavi high School, Asset building and Rice warehouse for export. During this period, the construction of an alternative Haraz road, it was handed over to the Russian company Treskiniski by the Reza Shah.

Hyacinth Louis Rabino, with visiting Amol during this period, described Amol as an open town with four gates, nine-quarters, and approximately 2000 houses. A large bazaar contained about 400 shops with many traditional crafts and trades.

In the during Mohammad Reza Pahlavi, The construction of Taleb Amoli Street in the western part of the old city and its extension in 1973 to 1975 was completed and the texture of the city was changed. Street Shahpur, Street Reza Shah Kabir, Street Farhang, Street Saadi, Shir-o-Khorshid Hospital, Imamzadeh Abdollah and Spinning, weaving and textile factories were built. Road 77, Sepah-e danesh school, Paddy factory, Grundig and Kubota in Iran it came to fruition in 1963. Supporting Abali hotel, Rineh tourism center and Reinforcement of Amol port it was done as a tourism project. During this period, the municipal sewage system and electricity were modernized. During this period, behest to Reza Shah the railway between Tehran and Amol began seventeen years ago, and gradually a large part of it was built, except for sixty kilometers between Abegarm and Amol, Which totally stopped construction in September in the beginning Anglo-Soviet invasion to Iran.
In the end of the kingdom an agreement was signed between the Ministry of Agriculture of the Pahlavi Government of Iran and the Ministry of Economic Affairs of the Republic of China on the extension of agricultural technical cooperation to develop research and increase rice production, and was implemented at the Amol Rice Research Institute of Iran.

With the beginning of the Islamic Republic of Iran The forest uprising implement. The Jungle Uprising in 1982 of the Union of Iranian Communists (Sarbedaran) mobilized its forces to jungles around Amol and started some wars against the Islamic Republic in those jungles. It finally organized a famous uprising on January 25, 1982. The Communist Union, based on its Maoist policy, and with its mindset of guerrilla and peasant wars, establishment on the outskirts of Haraz Road pathway of several important provinces and cities of the country and suitable camouflage of Amol forest and mine reasons to choose in the forest its strategy for war. the union has assassinated 600 people during three operations in Amol in November 9 and 13, 1981 and January 25, 1982.
the Mojahedin used machine guns and rocket-propelled grenade launchers against units of the Pasdaran. Smaller left-wing opposition groups, including the Organization of Iranian People's Fedai Guerrillas, attempted similar guerrilla activities. In July 1981, members of the Union of Communists tried to seize control of the town of Amol. This uprising was a failure and most of the Maoist and UIC leaders were hanged but the uprising itself became very famous and is well respected among some Iranian Leftist organizations. It also experienced various theoretical and political crises. The clashes lasted from November to February for four months.

This day became known in the Iranian calendar named Epic 6 Bahman or Epic of the People of Amol.
After this incident, Ruhollah Khomeini only mentioned the name of the city of Amol in political and divine testament and wrote, We have to thank the people of Amol.

21st century

Some of the most recent projects have been the complete restoration of the Bazaar and of the Imam reza street, as well as a comprehensive plan for the preservation of the old city quarters. A lot of different construction projects are currently underway, which intend to modernize the city's infrastructure.
In the last few years, many square, towers, boulevards and bridge were built in Amol. For example, Haraz Street one of the most modern streets of northern Iran. Amol is growingly turning into an industrialized town like most of the Iranian large cities.
Today, Amol is a thriving metropolis. One of the things they really lack is an airport so there are no cheap flights to Amol. Some of the most famous companies in Iran have main offices located in this city. Good secondary and tertiary education is being offered here as well. Islamic Azad University, for instance, is one of the biggest universities in the Middle East. Now in Amol there municipality and special governor. Amol is one of the research centers for scientific development, knowledge-based sciences and Science and Technology Park of Iran. At present, Amol, as the center of dairy and livestock products, mining sand, nurture products such as meat, flowers and fish and production rice of Iran. It Industrial machinery products is also very popular in Amol and Iran Heavy Diesel Factory is located in Amol Industrial Town.

At present especially since 2017, in addition to mass construction of residential buildings, the construction of small streets and hall sport in the deprived areas of the city has accelerated.

Bitter events
 Amol Gullies were completely destroyed. Since Sasanian Empire then the town has suffered earthquake and flood damage several times, but each time has recovered, and it is still a considerable town. During the Pahlavi dynasty, the city was burned twice dore to fire.
 Flooding in Mount Deryouk, and the destruction of entire city.
 Dangerous diseases that plague the year 1198 AH
 The outbreak of the dangerous plague that took place in 1198 AH destroyed countless civilians
 The war of the local kings with the Arabs
 Mongol invasion of Genghis Khan and his descendants to Tabaristan
 Wajih ad-Din Masud attack in Amol
 Battle Alavid and Saffarian Samanid in Amol
 Battle House of Karen and Bavandids in city
 Samanid Empire attack to royan and Amol with House of Ispahbudhan
 Timur war with the kings Marashis and killing people and battle with Iskandar-i shaykhi
 Attack Mas'ud I of Ghazni on the city
 Shah Ismail I and Shah Abbas Safavid King wars attack the Amol and killing people
 Agha Mohammad Khan Qajar attacked the Larijan and Amol, killing people and destroy the city
 Conflagration in 1335 AH which caused a lot of damage and severe destruction of the city. This fire and fire occurred in the year 6 AH, which first started near the Niyaki ridge and was swept across the city by the wind and reached the Haraz River and caused a fire to the gunpowder shop and ammunition shop. The shop exploded and a terrible fire broke out across the river, and then the whole city of Amol was blown away by the wind. It is known that the fire took place in April, when residents were enjoying the Nowruz celebration, and much of the city was turned gray
 Sangchal (Bandpay) earthquake of July 2, 1957
 Destroying people with Disease glanders

First of Iran 
 The first steel mill in Iran
 The first artillery and gunpowder workshop in Iran
 The first foundry in Iran
 The first modern railway in Iran
 The first banknote printing factory in Iran
 The first road building in Iran
 The first commercial port in northern Iran
 The first cotton gin factory in Iran
 The first mineral water factory in Iran
 The first mdf wood factory in Iran
 The oldest seminary in Iran

In literature

The first Aryan dynasty mentioned in Ferdowsi masterpiece at the Shahnameh.
The name Amol has come up 16 times directly in Shahnameh. In the Persian epic, Shahnameh, Mazandaran is mentioned in two different sections. The first mention is implicit, when Fereydun sets its capital in city called Amol:

―Ferdowsi

Hero Iran Arash in Amol threw an arrow to determine the Iranian border, Arash throw from the castle with Amol sequel and its agents to reach the border to have called Turan. The arrow flew the entire morning and fell at noon on the far bank of the Oxus River in what is now Central Asia.

―Fakhruddin As'ad Gurgani

Geography

The city has Mediterranean climate with very hot summers and cool and humid winters. Maximum rainfall is usually in the month of December and minimum in the month of July.
Amol is located on the banks of the Haraz River (26 25'N 52 21'E) at an altitude of 76 m above the sea. It is about 18 km from the Caspian Sea and about 10 km from the northern Alborz mountains. It is 180 km from the Iranian capital, Tehran, with a picturesque drive through Haraz Road. Sari the capital of Mazandaran is 70 km east of Amol. Mount Damavand (5610 m), the highest peak in the Middle East, is located south of Amol.
Amol, with its elevated landscape and valleys, has dense forests. Its tall hills overlook the plains and stretch out till the high slopes of the Mount Damavand. The majestic and deep rocky valleys, rivers, numerous springs, elevated waterfalls, colorful vegetation, a variety of wild life, thermal springs, summer quarters, and rural settlements are some of the special factors which can prove attractive.

Ecology
Amol has it lot of dense forests and pastures.
The ecology of Tabaristan region had been an impediment to provide a regularly communicative path and Haraz path is one of the oldest ones that had communicated the north of Iran to the central plateau in different periods. This study attempts to deal with archaeological data of this communicative path in Sasanian period and at the beginning of Islam. A descriptive-analytical method and scaling archeological investigation in region has been used in the study. the vegetation of the region can be divided into forest and grassland.
Caspian horse It is also called Khazar Horse to be found the first time in Amol rediscovered in 1965 by Louise Firouz. also Mazandaran tiger there in the jungle Amol city.

Coherent
Haraz Dam is the biggest dam north of Iran under construction on the Haraz River about 20 km from Amol of the year 2009 by Khatam-al Anbiya Construction Headquarter. It is a 150-meter earth rockfill dam with 8.6 million cubic meters of fill volume.

JGC Corporation has also held talks to build a waste-to-energy plant, also known as waste incinerator, in the city of Amol in the northern Mazandaran Province.

Climate
Amol has somewhat short, but hot summers, and mild winters, with a noticeable seasonal lag. Köppen-Geiger climate classification system classifies its climate as humid subtropical climate (Köppen: Cfa, Trewartha: Cf).

Weather
The climate of Amol city is similar to other parts of Mazandaran; in hot and humid summers and mild winters. The maximum amount of rainfall falls in December and the least in July. It has a special climate in its regions.

Excavation sites
In recent years, on the excavation hill Qaleh Kesh, some ancient jewelry was discovered. Radiocarbon analysis revealed the background of the jewelry and objects to date from the 1st millennium BC, Bronze Age.
New to explore in Baliran works of the era found Paleolithic.

Population
The population history of the city proper is as follows. All figures are official census figures from the Iranian Statistics Institute.

Breakdown of 2006 census:

Language, religion, timeline

Most Amoli people speak the Mazandarani language Tabari as a mother tongue; however, Persian is the most common language spoken in Iran and the lingua franca.
Northern provinces of Iran in the Parthian or Sassanid period, probably, was Zoroastrian. There clearly are temples in the province. Mazandaran people converted to Islam around the second century AH. Amol as the first prime city center was a Twelver Shiite theocracy. At present, the majority of people are followers of Shia Islam.
Amol, mazandaran has its own calendar months in addition to the official Tabari calendar of the moon, used in the era of Yazdgerd.
Based on experiments and research Max Planck Society, The people of Mazandaran have long been the most original people living in Iran.

Economy

Amol is the center of dairy, Poultry and livestock products, Steel building and rice in Iran.
Mineral water, meat, dairy, Wood, Metal machine products and ingots the main production industrial are in city. Agriculture and Tourism are the basis economy Amol economic base is in its provincial products. Agriculture has always been a major part of the economy in and around Amol.

Amol is the economic center of Mazandaran province, with Agriculture and Tourism being the base of the Amol economy. Rice, grain, fruits, cotton, tea, sugarcane, and silk are produced in the lowland.
Mineral water, meat, dairy, wood and ingots are the main manufacturing industry.
68% of exports of Mazandaran in Amol done.
In the 18th century – 19th century, Amol iron and iron goods were traded all over Iran and as far abroad as Baghdad and Damascus and The society of linen, rice, handicrafts, honey, wood, mat and gold to trade house in Rome and the Gulf countries. Now export Food products, Citrus, Ornamental flowers, Cement and sand, Meat products, Industrial machinery, Rapeseed, Power cord, Electronic equipment and Mineral water is exported to several countries, including Afghanistan, Russia, Netherlands, Iraq, Pakistan, Turkmenistan, Turkey, Oman, Qatar, Angola, Oman, United Arab Emirates, Azerbaijan and Germany.

Rice

The Rice Research Institute of Iran, has been established in 1963 and through its 50 years of research activity, it has had significant impacts on the rice cultivation in the region. The Rice Research Center is located in Amol.
At the ceremony opening of Haraz Road, Mohammad Reza Shah Pahlavi introduced Amol as the capital of rice and science. Winston Churchill stated that Tehran was supplied with rice by Mazandaran because of transportation facilities through the Amol.
Amol rice is considered a high quality product and is exported across the world. Iran's rice export terminal at Amol was established 2016.
Iran International Rice Trade Center and Export Terminal was inaugurated of Amol, on August 21, 2019, in the presence of First Vice President Hassan Rouhani. The center has been established with private investment amounting to over 1 trillion rials ($8.58 million) on earth over 17 hectares. Nowadays, is rice seedling celebration every year in Amol.

Industry
Amol of primary cities in the production of bricks, tobacco, rice, paper and guns from thousands of years ago.
Ultra Quality Rice and Fresh Fruits are major products of Amol Farmers. 65% Industry Mazandaran province it is located in Amol. He is one of the centers meat and dairy products in Iran. Horticulture, greenhouse the city's other important activities.
The company Solico that Including Kalleh dairy and Kalleh meat one of the biggest corporations in Asia located in Amol.
Currently, three industrial town is active in county named, Industrial Estate, Amol, Babakan Industrial Estate and Tashbandan.
also Iran Heavy Diesel Manufacturing Company, the car and ship's locomotive engine maker is based in Amol. Security paper of Iran producer of securities, banknotes, checks, passport pages and birth certificates it is produced by Takab in Amol.

Major corporations
Domestic companies

Kalleh Company (dairy – meat)
DESA Iran Heavy Diesel Manufacturing Company DESA
Fouladin Zob (FZA)
TAKAB Security Paper Mill – Iranian Money Printing
Khazar Electric
Haraz Dairy
Delveseh Food Industries
Polur Mineral Water
Nestlé Iran
Zarbal
Abescon
Nasaji Babakan
Aras Bazar pharmaceutical Co
Garma Electric
Amolo Mineral Water
Zarrin Soleh Jam
Dirgodaz Amol

Safa Industrial Group
SPS
Amol Boresh
Mazandaran Cable
Nava Mineral Water
Baaz
Tpciran
Mollen
Sepidan
Gela Dairy
Khazar Choob
PGA (Peyman)
Sangsa
Kardar Group

Foreign companies

Nestlé Pure Life
Hochland SE

Native 
Pottery is common in the city. Pottery is the material from which the potteryware is made, of which major types include earthenware, stoneware and porcelain. The place where such wares are made is also called a pottery. Pottery also refers to the art or craft of the potter or the manufacture of pottery. There are also fish farming center in the foothills and around the city, including trout and sturgeon. Today, the percentage of aquaculture production in Amol is equal to the Caspian Sea.

Public Service
Shopping

The city is served by Refah Chain Stores Co., Iran Hyper Star, Isfahan City Center, Shahrvand Chain Stores Inc., Ofoq Kourosh chain store.

Most of the branded stores and upper-class shops are in the It is located in the center of the city streets Mahdieh, Shahradari, 17 Shahrivar, Mostafa Khomeini, Heraz and Taleghani and Sabzeh Meydan neighborhood.
 Oxin City Center
 Aftab Mall
 Ghaem Shopping Center
 Sepehr complex
 Oxin Mall
 Ghaem Gold Mall
 Grand Passage Amol
 Morvarid Passage
 Farzaneh Passage
 Akhavan Passage
 Mirdamad Passage

Hotel

The first hotel in the city with the name Hotel Shahr was built by Austrian engineers in the year 1972 and used to be called Shahrdari (Municipality) Hotel. It later got renovated in 2014 to be used as an accommodation by visitors.

Hospital

Culture
Amol long history has ancestors because of intellectuals and local and national events. depending on the culture of the people some of the ancient ceremony of Mazandaran Islamic traditions mingled,
Amol is a center for Iranian culture and has produced a number of famous poets. Wool, felting, felt hat production and mat weaving are part of the Amoli culture. Varf Chal, Locho Wrestling, Palm and Tiregan named Damavand National Day are local events held each year. Tirgan important celebrations in Iran's history. In Mazandaran, this day is known as Tir Maah Sizdah Sho. The name literally means 13th night of the month of Tir. It occurs on 12th of Aban, the 8th month of Persian calendar, and is celebrated in province of Mazandaran. Its history goes back to pre-Islamic era of Iran, and is mentioned in accredited history book of Tarikh Tabari. The celebration has specific procedure, 13 different kinds of edibles are prepared and members of the household should stay home for that special night. Tiregan is one of the biggest festivals in ancient Iran. Traditionally, it is held on the Tir day (ancient days) of Tir month, equal to the 13th of the month in the Zoroastrian calendar, and equivalent to the 10th of Tir in Shamsi year.
Tiregan is celebrated on 13th on Tir in the foothills of Rineh city of Larijan in Amol, Mazandaran Province. It is celebrated by splashing water, dancing, reciting poetry, and serving traditional foods such as spinach soup and sholezard. The custom of tying rainbow-colored bands on wrists, which are worn for ten days and then thrown into a stream, is also a way to rejoice for children.
other ceremony is called Varf Chal, Every spring, people in Ab Ask, a village near the northern city of Amol, mark a 600-year-old ceremony called Varf Chal, which literally means snow storing.

Nowruz Iranians celebrate ancient is also important in Amol. Nowruz Khani, or singing for Nowruz, is a Tabari Gilani tradition in which in the latest days of the year before the Persian New Year (Nowrooz), people go at the door of their neighbors and sing songs about the impending coming of the spring.
Locho wrestling is held in the north of Iran in Mazandaran as a traditional, frankly and ancient sport for 1600 years. This wrestling, which is also known to be the Locho heroic sport, has a particular position in the culture and valuable beliefs of the locals and now, it has been a national registered heritage.
Amoli people are said to spend much on books, clothes and food. They spend the leisure times going to cinemas, art exhibitions, music concerts and international book fairs that are being held in the city most of times in a year.
Amol is known as the city of Mystics and philosophers, Hezar sangar, Productive and Alavian. Amol has been host Fajr International Theater Festival and Jasmine International Film Festival.

Old city

Old district of Amol
The main body of the old city of Amol is located in the old bazaar Amol. The old bazaar is the main pillar and core of the city's organizer, and its original existence dates back to before Islam and its core 900 years ago. The main constituents of the city Bazaar Amol known as Paein Baazar or  Bazaar Chaharsogh situated in the city center, has lost some of its former importance due to social, economic and historical reasons. The roofs of the shops here are made of earthenware tiles on an incline so as to be a protection against the sun and rain. The open spaces within, are used to set up weekly bazaars.
Historic mosque and old houses located along market and tribe quarters of the people is also available in the market. Tuesday era Sassanid, Qajar and contemporary is evident in the alleys of the market and its neighborhoods.

Older neighborhoods

Bazaar Chahar Soogh (بازار چهارسوق)
Kashi Mahaleh (کاشی محله)
Moshaei Mahaleh (مشایی محله)
Shahandasht Mahaleh (شاهاندشت محله)
Shahrbanu Mahaleh (شهربانو محله)
Kardgar Mahaleh Amiriha  (کاردگر محله امیری ها)
Gorji Mahaleh (گرجی محله)
Espeh-Kola (اسپه کلا)
Qadi Mahaleh (قادی محله)
Niaki Mahaleh (نیاکی محله)
Rodgari Mahaleh Chaksar (رودگری محله چاکسر)
Gol Bagh Mahaleh (گلباغ محله)
Aski Mahaleh (اسکی محله)
Chelabi Mahaleh (چلابی محله)
Khavar Mahaleh (خاور محله)
Haron Mahaleh (هارون محله)
Sabze Meydan (سبزه میدان)
Rezvanieh (رضوانیه)
Avam Koy (عوام کوی)

Historical and natural attractions
In City and County:
 Mount Damavand is a stratovolcano which is the highest peak in Iran and the Middle East. It has a special place in Persian mythology and folklore.
 Mausoleum of Mir Bozorg (Tomb of Qavam al-Din Marashi)
 Lar Dam
 Lar National Park
 Mosque of Hasan al-Utrush Originally a small tomb tower before renovation.
 Sayyid Haydar Amoli (Seyyed Se Tan Tomb tower)
 Moalagh Bridge
 Davazdah Cheshmeh Bridge
 Shahandasht Waterfall
 Amol Bazaar
 Amol History Museum
 Malek Bahman Castle
 Nassereddin Shah relief (known as Shekl-e Shah)
 Jameh Mosque of Amol
 Agha Abbas Mosque
 Kafar Koli Caves
 Yakhi Waterfall
 Waterfall Deryouk
 Shah Abbasi Baths
 Fire Temple of Amol (known as Shams Al-Rasol)
 Imamzadeh Ibrahim 
 The Sasanian Road
 Zaman Valley
 Tower Khidr Nabi
 Village forest Blairan 
 Village forest Alimastan
 Gol-e Zard Cave
 Manouchehri Mansion
 Shafahi House
 Ab Ask Thermal Springs
 Ashraf Bath
 Inn Kemboja
 Heshtel Towers
 Kahrud Castle
 Sangi Bridge Polour
 Imam Hassan Askari Mosque
 Imamzadeh Qasem Shrine
 Imamzadeh Abdollah Shrine
 Mohammad Taher Shrine
 Ab ask Thermal Springs
 Lake Sahon
 Haj Ali Kochak Mosque
 Ab Murad Waterfall
 Sang Darka Waterfall
 Amoloo Mineral Water Spring
 Forest Park Mirza Kuchak Khan Haraz
 Forest Park Halumsar
 Ziaru Jungle
 Dehkadeh Talaei Park
 Larijan Hot Spring
 Dokhaharan lake
 Hosseiniyeh of Amol
 Plain Shaghayegh Larijan
 Gabri Tower
 Mir-Safi Baths
 Tomb Darvish Sheikh Ismail
 Robat Sangi Polur
 Prairie anemone of Polur
 Haj Ali Arbab House
 Do Berar Peak
 Sahun Lake
 Ancient Hill Qaleh Kesh
 Larijan Thermal Spring
 Rineh Thermal Springs
 Kolakchal Mountain
 Ghoredagh Mountain
 Div Asiyab Spring
 Hand Caves in Larijan
 Tekyeh Firuz Kola
 Amiri Waterfall
 Mahan Waterfall
 Lasem Ab Morad Waterfall
 Pol-e Mun Castle
 Saghanefar Hendu Kola
 Saghanefar Zarrin Kola
 Tomb of Sultan Shahabuddin
 Takyeh Oji Abad

Historical monuments destroyed 
There was many other historical monuments in Amol which has been destroyed or destroyed throughout history.
Here is a list of most famous:

Amol government house (Dar al-Hakuma), The dome of Iraj son of Fereydoun, the house and bathhouse of Khajeh Yaghoub Majusi, Ameleh Palace and Tomb, Mashhad Sheikh Abu Turab, Sheikh Zahid Firooi tomb, Shrine Hassan ibn Hamza Alavi, Shrine of Sharaf al-Din, Shahriar Taj al-Dawla shrine, Malik Ashtar mosque and minaret, Firoozabad palace, Fortification Amol, Palace Khosrow Parviz, Parthian Fortress, Chaikhori mansion, Qal'eh Dokhtar, Afshar Soldiers camp, Khalidsara castle, Mahaneh Sar castle, Kahrud castle, Gabri tower, Eight caravanserais, Six baths, Twelve Ab anbar, Several mansions and as well as the garden and mansion of Shah Abbas Safavid.

Souvenir
List:

Food

Transportation

Air base
Amol is an air base with two helicopters relief Hilal Ahmar. This is the first center of Iran's air rescue.

By rail
In 1886, during the time of Nasser-al-Din Shah, an 8.7 km  horse-driven suburban railway was established south of Tehran, which was later converted to steam. This line was closed in 1952. The First Iranian railway was set up in 1887 between Mahmudabad and Amol; its construction was completely private. However it was not used because of several problems.
Now fast train north, Tehran to Amol of 2013 starts and 2020 ends.

By car and bus
Amol the largest urban boulevard and highways within mazandaran in the city is. are five bus terminals, Terminal international firuzi, the largest terminal in North of Iran is.
Also offers an extensive bus route throughout the entire municipality as well as numerous public and private taxi services.

Road

 
Haraz Road (Road 77) is the most important road from Tehran to northern Iran (province of Mazandaran) besidesKaraj-Chaloos. This road passes from the valley of Haraz river and therefore is also known as Haraz Road between Amol and Rudehen. Haraz road is the nearest road to Mount Damavand, the highest peak in Iran and Middle East. Lar National Park is accessible via this road. The road is the shortest route from Tehran to the north (180 km). In recent years, some parts of the road have been widened and safety has been improved. The ancient road is part of the Haraz road near Vana where ancient relics of the Old Road to Amol are visible. The road was replaced by the Veresk Road. Amol is the city with the largest boulevards and highways of Mazandaran. Haraz International Road Road One of Iran's most important roads is Amol, which connects other cities to northern Iran. Roads such as Amol-Babol, Amol-Mahmoudabad (Coastal Road), Amol-Fereydunkenar and Amol-Noor can also be reached. Cited.

Streets and boulevards

 Haraz Street
 Imam Reza Street
 Taleb Amoli Boulevard
 Ayatollah Taleghani Boulevard
 Nour Street
 Mahdieh Street
 Enghelab Street
 Janbazan Street
 Monfared Niyaki Boulevard
 Ayatollah Modarres Boulevard
 Yousefian Boulevard
 Muhammad ibn Jarir Tabari Street
 17 Shahrivar Street
 Basij Boulevard
 Laleh Street
 Farhang Street
 Amin Tabarsi Boulevard
 Shahid Beheshti Street
 Mostafa Khomeini Street
 Pasdaran Street
 Azadegan Boulevard
 Velayat Boulevard
 Motahhari Boulevard
 Hilal Ahmar Street
 Shahid Ghassemi Boulevard
 Resalat Street

Customs
International has been a large port in the old days of the port, a major trading port in northern Iran, in the past it has become a city of Mahmoudabad (Ahlam), and now Amol Customs is being operated as part of Amol Customs, Central Customs. It is located in the city of Amol and Amol products are exported to other cities under the supervision of Amol under water, land and air borders.

Science

In the third to ninth centuries, Amol had in numbers 70 Khanqah and universities.
In the 11th century, Nizam al-Mulk, in his famous book named Siyasatnama, recommended creation of modern institutions by the name of Nezamiyeh with academic status in the large cities of the Islamic world, such as Balkh, Baghdad, Damascus, Neishabour and Bukhara the name of Amol was also included among them. Most of Allameh the Iran are born in this city.
also the first seminary by Hasan al-Utrush built in Amol, which was later named Imam Hassan Askari Mosque.
Amol at various times was the center of science and culture in Iran, for example, Abu Sa'id Abu'l-Khayr, Muhammad ibn Zakariya al-Razi, Nasir al-Din al-Tusi and Avicenna, Three great men of Iran so-named Polymath respectively students Abul-Abbas Qassab Amoli, Ali ibn Sahl Rabban al-Tabari, Siraj Qumri and Abu Abdullah Al-Natili all three were born and residents of Amol. Also great historian of the world Muhammad ibn Jarir al-Tabari, was from Amol.
Today likewise, scientific centers such as universities and schools and scientific congresses are active in the city.
This branch of Pasteur Institute of Iran is located in the city of Amol in the state of Mazandaran. This institute comprises different departments.
Amol with University of Special Modern Technologies and Tehran with Tehran University of Medical Sciences stable hosted of Special Modern Technologies USERN.

Colleges and universities
Some of the biggest universities of Iran such as Shomal University are situated in Amol. 

Amol has three universities:
 Shomal University (Non-profit University)
 Amol University of Special Modern Technologies (The first state University of Amol)
 Islamic Azad University, Science and Research Branch, Amol (One of The big University Middle East in terms of area)
 Aban Haraz Institute of Higher Education
 Amol University
 Mazandaran 5 (University of Applied Science and Technology UAST)
 Sabz Institute of Higher Education
 PNU Amol (Payame Noor University)
 Sama College
 Nursing and Paramedical (University of Medical Sciences)
 Pasteur Institute, Iran of Amol
 College of Samangan
 Applied Science Center Fza
 Amol Tohid girls College
 Allameh Hasanzadeh Amoli College
 University of Quranic Sciences
 Farhangian University at Amol

Schools
In Amol, the first new school was established in Niaki neighborhood next to Seyed Hassan Attar residential house, owned by Shir Mohammad Ali Gazaneh, with three classrooms called the Islamic National School. They were able to sign a contract with two brothers, Haji Khan and Mahmoud Khan Golpayegani. The school was opened and started with the management of Haji Khan and Mahmoud Khan's teacher in 1904, one year before the victory of the Persian Constitutional Revolution.
Other schools were built during the Pahlavi dynasty, such as Malekzadeh High School, Farhang School, Shahdookht School, Iran Girls' Elementary School, Nusrat School, Shariatzadeh School, Tabari High School, Danesh national primary School and Pahlavi High School.
Pahlavi High School that's today is known as Imam Khomeini High School, it was built in 1934 by German architecture engineers. The school was in 2019 registered to Iran National Heritage List.

Sport
Wrestling, Volleyball, Handball, Futsal, Basketball, Boxing, Race car, Mountaineering, Bodybuilding, Karate, Taekwondo and Kung Fu Popular sports in Amol.
Kalleh Mazandaran is a volleyball club based in Amol, Asian Club Champions 2013, currently competing in the highest tier of the Iranian volleyball classification, the Iranian Volleyball Super League. Kalleh a Most Popular in Iran and Asia. Kalleh Sports Club also has a basketball team named Kalleh Basketball and Young team volleyball named Kalleh Javan.

Wrestling and volleyball
Amol is the birthplace of many popular Wrestlers and Volleyball athletes.
Notable Athlete from Amol include like, Ghasem Rezaei Olympic gold and bronze medalist and Adel Gholami player in national team.

Club

Stadium
 Payambar Azam Arena
 Chamran Stadium
 Kalleh Stadium

Host
 2007 WAFF Futsal Championship
 West Asian Basketball Championship
 International Fajr Chess Championships 2018
 International Conference of Sport Science 2017
 FIVB Volleyball Coaches Course Level II held in Iran 2018
 Asia Chess Championship 2017

Media and Cinema 
The early in Amol published many newspapers and publications ever since the constitution was a major strength in Mazandaran province. Now, several newspapers and weekly print is active. The first newspaper in Amol the name Mazandaran, Lesan Mellat and Shamshir Mellat released in 1949.
There are 3 cinemas. Farhang Cinema was the first Amol cinema to be built by Ebrahim Monfared in 1952 with a capacity of 200 seats. Moulin Rouge, Metropole and Arash other cinemas in the city were before the revolution.

Notable people

Distance
Away with some of the major cities in Iran:

Sister cities

References

External links

Tourismo Amol
chnpress.com
lovelyiran.com
itto.org
parrpirar.org
Yourwonder Amol
Amol Chto
Amol DataBase
english.irib.ir

 
Populated places in Amol County
Cities in Mazandaran Province
Former capitals of Iran
Archaeological sites in Iran
Places in Shahnameh
Parthian cities
Sasanian cities
Burial sites of the Alavid dynasty
Mar'ashis